Tom Hiddleston is an English actor of the stage and screen. He is known well for his performances in film, television and theatre. In 2012, he received a BAFTA Rising Star Award nomination. He has received two Primetime Emmy Award nominations and two Golden Globe Award nominations for producing and acting in the AMC limited series The Night Manager (2016), winning the Golden Globe Award for Best Actor – Miniseries or Television Film.

He has also received awards for his work on the London stage, earning three Laurence Olivier Award nominations winning Best Newcomer in a Play for his performance as Posthumus Leonatus & Cloten in William Shakespeare play Cymbeline in 2008. In 2020, he was nominated for his Broadway debut for Best Actor in a Play for his performance as Robert in the revival of Harold Pinter's Betrayal.

Major associations

British Academy Film Awards

Golden Globe Awards

Laurence Olivier Awards

Primetime Emmy Awards

Tony Awards

Miscellaneous awards

References 

Hiddleston, Tom